Rhododendron fulvum is a species of flowering plant in the heath family Ericaceae, native to northern Myanmar and China. In China, it is found in southwest Sichuan, southeast Xizang, and western Yunnan. The undersides are felted with a striking cinnamon colour. The flowers, borne in trusses in spring, are loosely bell-shaped, pale rose pink, with a crimson basal blotch and sometimes red spots.

In cultivation in the UK Rhododendron fulvum has gained the Royal Horticultural Society’s Award of Garden Merit. It is hardy down to  but requires a sheltered spot in dappled shade, and an acid soil enriched with leaf mould.

Lower taxa
Rhododendron fulvum subsp. fulvoides (I. B. Balfour & Forrest) D. F. Chamberlain
Rhododendron fulvum subsp. fulvum (listed as a synonym by some authorities)

References

 "Rhododendron fulvum", I. B. Balfour & W. W. Smith, Notes Roy. Bot. Gard. Edinburgh. 10: 110. 1917.

fulvum
Taxa named by Isaac Bayley Balfour
Taxa named by William Wright Smith